Rudolph IV, Count of Neufchâtel (died 1272) was a son of Count Berthold and his first wife, Richezza.

Rudolph married Sibylle, a daughter of Count Theodoric III of Montbéliard and had the following children:
 Amadeus, his successor
 Henry, baron of Thièle
 John provost of Neufchâtel, baron of Hasenburg
 Richard, a canon
 Agnelette
 Margaret, married a Lord of Blenay

Counts of Neuchâtel
13th-century births
Year of birth unknown
1272 deaths
13th-century nobility